William Henry Wylde may refer to:
 William Henry Wylde (politician) (1817–?)
 William Henry Wylde (civil servant) (1819–1909)

See also
 William Wylde (1788–1877), Royal Artillery officer